{{Infobox school
|name                   = St. Gregory's College
|logo                   = 
|seal_image             = 
|image                  = St Gregory's College, Lagos.jpg
|image_size             =250px
|motto                  = Pro Fide Et Scientia'
|location               = South West Ikoyi Lagos
|streetaddress          = 
|region                 = 
|city                   = Ikoyi, Lagos
|state                  = Lagos State
|country                = Nigeria
|coordinates            = 
|schooltype             = High school
|fundingtype            = 
|type                   = Missionary
|religious_affiliation  = Roman Catholic, Christian
|denomination           = Catholic
|established            = 
|founder                = Catholic Mission
|status                 =
|locale                 = 
|sister_school          = Holy Child College Obalende
|category               = 
|category_label         = 
|administrator          = Reverend Father Emmanuel Ayeni
|director               = 
|principal              = 
|staff                  = 
|faculty                = 
|teaching_staff         = 
|employees              = 
|key_people             = 
|grades                 = 7–12
|years                  = 
|gender                 = Male (Formerly mixed gender)
|lower_age              = 
|upper_age              = 
|age range              = 
|enrolment              = 
|enrollment             = 
|enrollment_as_of       = 
|students               = 
|sixth_form_students    = 
|classes                = 
|avg_class_size         = 
|ratio                  = 
|system                 = 
|classes offered        = 
|medium                 = 
|language               = 
|schedtyp               = 
|schedule               = 
|hours_in_day           = 
|classrooms             = 
|campuses               = 
|campus                 = 
|campus size            = 
|area                   = 
|campus type            = 
|houses                 = St Augustine, St Peter, St Francis, St Benedict
|colours                =  Green,  Purple, 
|colors                 = 
|slogan                 = Up Gregs
|song                   = 
|fightsong              = 
|athletics              = 
|conference             = 
|sports                 = 
|mascot                 = 
|mascot image           = 
|nickname               = Gregs
|team_name              = 
|rival                  = Kings College Lagos
|accreditation          = 
|ranking                = 
|national_ranking       = 
|testname               = 
|testaverage            = 
|SAT                    = 
|ACT                    = 
|bar pass rate          = 
|roll                   = 
|decile                 = 
|publication            = 
|newspaper              = 
|yearbook               = 
|products               = 
|endowment              = 
|budget                 = 
|fees                   = 
|tuition                = 
|revenue                = 
|communities            =
|feeders                = 
|main feeder school for = 
|graduates              =
|affiliations           = 
|alumni                 = 
|nobel_laureates        = 
|information            = 
|website                =  Official Website  Unofficial Website (Oldest running)
}}
St. Gregory's College, Lagos, is a catholic missionary school for boys, with boarding facilities, located 1.0 km from Tafawa Balewa Square in the vicinity of Ikoyi – Obalende, Lagos State, Nigeria.

History
The college, originally a coed campus before the creation of its sister school Holy Child College Obalende, is based in South-West Ikoyi. It was established through the Catholic mission in 1928 and named after Pope St. Gregory the Great (540–604). Entrepreneur Michael Ibru and his construction outfit Ace Jomona took part in the building of the school.

In the late 1990s, during the encouragement of internet use by innovators and governing bodies, a class of 1997 alum and early adopter technologist A. Olufeko, built the college's first and most recognisable online presence using HTML and CGI programming in the year 1998, based on the need to assist alumni connect with each other globally. Subsequently, as the city of Lagos embraced the digital economy, alumni from different graduating sets, and the school's administration eventually established an official website in 2018.

Athletics
Saint Gregory's most notable sports teams have been its cricket and football squads.

Principals and administrators

Notable alumni

 Adetokunbo Ademola† Chief Justice of the Supreme Court of Nigeria.
Jab Adu, actor and director
 Jimi Agbaje, Nigerian Pharmacist, Politician, and governorship candidate for Lagos.
 Ben Murray Bruce, Nigerian business magnate and politician.
 Sir Adeyemo Alakija KBE†, Nigerian lawyer, politician and businessman.
 Ade Abayomi Olufeko, Technologist, designer and entrepreneur.
 Ganiyu Dawodu †, Nigerian politician and democracy activist.
 Oba C. D. Akran †, Traditional titleholder of Badagry and Nigerian politician
 Antonio Deinde Fernandez†, Nigerian Business magnate and diplomat.
 Adewale Maja-Pearce, Writer, journalist and critic.
 J. M. Johnson †, Nigerian Politician.
 Jibril Martin†, Nigerian lawyer. 
 Olufemi Majekodunmi, British-Nigerian architect.
 Raymond Njoku†, Nigerian politician and former minister for Transport.
 Mike Omoighe, Nigeria Artist and critic.
 Segun Agbaje, Bank Executive of GTBank.
 Cardinal Anthony Olubunmi Okogie, Archbishop of Lagos.
 Victor Uwaifo, Nigerian musician.
 Funsho Williams, Politician.
 Lamidi Adeyemi III, Alaafin of Oyo.
 Chief Ayo Gabriel Irikefe†, former Chief Justice of Nigeria.
 Denrele Edun, Nigerian television presenter.
 Patrick Ekeji, Nigerian sports administrator.
 Tunji Disu, Head of the Police Intelligence Response Team, IRT
 Tayo Aderinokun, Entrepreneur and former CEO of Guaranty Trust Bank.
 Obafemi Lasode, Nigerian veteran film actor.
 Nonso Amadi, Internationally renowned Afro-Fusion Singer/Songwriter
 Vector'' - Olanrewaju Ogunmefun, Nigerian Hip hop artist.
 Moses Majekodunmi†, Nigerian Senator.
 Tomi Davies, Entrepreneur and philanthropist. 
 Gbenga Shobo, Financial institution executive
 Rafiu Oluwa, Nigerian sprinter.
 David Dale, Renowned artist 
 Segun Gele, Fashion designer, head-tie stylist
 Bode Rhodes-Vivour, Justice of the Supreme Court of Nigeria.
 Shola Akinlade, Software engineer and CEO of Paystack
 Vincent Babatunde Chukumeka Nwuga, Professor of physiotherapy

See also

 Education in Nigeria
 List of schools in Lagos

References

External links
 , the school's official website
 , school's oldest running unofficial website since 1997

1928 establishments in Nigeria
Boys' schools in Nigeria
Educational institutions established in 1928
Catholic schools in Lagos
Roman Catholic secondary schools in Nigeria